Ribbe is a surname of German origin. People with that name include:

 Carl Ribbe (1860-1934), German explorer and entomologist
 Claude Ribbe (born 1954), French writer, historian, philosopher, and filmmaker 
 Heinrich Ribbe (1832-1898), German entomologist
 Markus Ribbe, American chemist

See also
 Ribbe's glassy acraea, a common name for the butterfly Acraea leucographa

 Surnames of German origin